Buffetia is a genus of air-breathing land snails, terrestrial pulmonate gastropod mollusks in the family Euconulidae. 

This is a nomen nudum (published without description)

Species
Species within the genus Buffetia include:
 Buffetia retinaculum (Preston, 1913): synonym of Allenoconcha retinaculum (Preston, 1913) (unavailable genus name)

References

External links
 redale, T. (1945). The land Mollusca of Norfolk Island. The Australian Zoologist. 11: 46-71 
 Köhler, F.; Bouchet, P. (2020). On unavailable genus-group names introduced by Tom Iredale for Australian non-marine gastropods: nomenclatural clarifications and descriptions of new genera. Molluscan Research. 40(2): 150–159 

 
Euconulidae
Taxonomy articles created by Polbot